Macro-Andean is a speculative proposal by Kaufman (2007) linking languages of the northern Andes. 

Kaufman (1990) found lexical support for proposals linking the Jivaro–Cahuapanan families as suggested by Swadesh and others. By 2007 he had tentatively added Saparo–Yawan, which is itself provisional, and Bora–Witoto.

Languages
Kaufman (2007) posits the following membership. The unclassified languages Urarina, Puelche, Sabela, Taushiro, Omurano are included in the Kawapanan and Yawan branches. 

Hivaro–Kawapánan
Kawapánan (Chayawita, Hevero, Urarina, Puelche)
Hivaro
Sáparo–Yawan
Sáparo
Yawan (Peva–Yawan, Sabela, Taushiro, Omurano)
Bora–Witotoan (including Andoque within Witotoan)

References
Kaufman, Terrence. 2007. Atlas of the World's Languages. 2nd edition.

External links 
 Kaufman's Macro-Andean at MultiTree

Proposed language families
Indigenous languages of the Andes